Hanwei may refer to:
It may refer to:
韩伟, 韓偉 hánwěi, the Chinese for Greater Korea
historical name for the Three Kingdoms of Korea 
Hanwei (egg producer) (韩伟 hánwěi), company based in Dalian, China
Wei Han (韓偉 Hán Wěi, 1906–1992), Lieutenant General of the Chinese People's Liberation Army 
Wei Han (韓偉 Hán Wěi, 1928–1984), Taiwanese scholar
Hanwei (sword producer) (汉威 hànwēi), company manufacturing swords based in Dalian, China